The San Francisco Bay AVA is a large American Viticultural Area centered on the San Francisco Bay Area of Northern California. The San Francisco Bay AVA includes the counties of Alameda, Contra Costa, Santa Clara, San Francisco and  San Mateo as well as parts of Santa Cruz and San Benito counties. The AVA falls within the larger Central Coast AVA and contains five designated sub-region AVAs within its boundaries; Lamorinda AVA, Livermore Valley AVA, Pacheco Pass AVA, San Ysidro District AVA, and Santa Clara Valley AVA.

References

External links
 TTB AVA Maps

American Viticultural Areas of the San Francisco Bay Area
Geography of Alameda County, California
Geography of San Francisco
Geography of San Mateo County, California
Geography of Santa Clara County, California
Geography of Santa Cruz County, California
Geography of Contra Costa County, California
Geography of San Benito County, California
American Viticultural Areas of California
American Viticultural Areas
1999 establishments in California